The Marvel universe debuted in the pages of Fantastic Four in 1961, created by Stan Lee and Jack Kirby. At that time, Strange Tales also published stories featuring the Fantastic Four cast, mostly the Human Torch and Thing, where other villains also debuted. The following is a list of antagonists that were introduced in Fantastic Four, Strange Tales and other Marvel comics. The Fantastic Four is regarded as possessing one of the strongest rogues' galleries in Marvel Comics.

Fantastic Four debuts

Strange Tales debuts

Other titles debuts

Other major villains
Stan Lee and Jack Kirby collaborated on the first 102 consecutive issues of Fantastic Four. Most of the major Marvel concepts, i.e., Latveria, Atlantis, Wakanda, Attilan, the Negative Zone, the Microverse, Subterranea and Avalon which later became a huge part of other major Marvel characters, debuted in Fantastic Four. Following are some of the villains who have gone on to become major villains of various Marvel franchises.

References

Enemies
Fantastic Four enemies, List of
Fantastic Four enemies